"Mountain" is a song recorded by Australian rock group, Chocolate Starfish. The song was released in February 1994 as the third single from their self-titled debut studio album (1994).

Background
In a 2012 interview, band member Adam Thompson said;  “I remember when we actually wrote "Mountain", we’d recorded "You're So Vain" and we’d written a whole bunch of other songs and we were looking for another single.  Zoran (Romich) had come up with a couple of chords and I was playing this game where I was running back from the gym, trying not to step on the cracks in the pavement... and suddenly the rhythm that I was running or jogging sort of fitted, and I had that chord going on in the background and I thought ‘Gee, that’s a good melody.’ And when I got back, virtually within a night, we’d written "Mountain"and we knew straight away that it was going to be a hit single. We just knew."

Thompson added; "And as for the lyric, I was over in L.A. with the band and left my girlfriend at home and she said ‘I don’t want you to tour anymore. When you come home, I want you to stay with me and get a normal job and to be a responsible boyfriend.’ And this was obviously my dream for eight or nine years to be in a band and the passion that I was trying to find and when I was writing the song, the metaphor of the mountain and the river just came to me. She wanted me to stay still, like a mountain, an immovable force and I felt like a river that was just meandering and finding its destiny. The guys and I just looked at it and said ‘Yep, that’s gonna work.’ and, of course, it did."

Track listing
CD Single (8740432)
 "Mountain"
 "Mountain" (acoustic)

Charts

References

Chocolate Starfish songs
1993 songs
1994 singles
Rock ballads
Songs about mountains